Maury Edwards (born March 16, 1987) is a Canadian professional ice hockey defenceman who is currently playing for ERC Ingolstadt in the Deutsche Eishockey Liga (DEL).

Playing career
Prior to turning professional, Edwards attended the University of Massachusetts Lowell where he played four seasons with the UMass Lowell River Hawks men's ice hockey team which competes in NCAA's Division I in the Hockey East conference.

During the 2012–13 season, Edwards was traded by the Cyclones to the Florida Everblades in exchange for Taylor Ellington on January 2, 2013.

On August 9, 2013, Edwards left North America and signed a one-year deal as a free agent with second tier German club, ESV Kaufbeuren. After a solitary season fighting relegation in the inaugural DEL2, Edwards left Kaufbeuren for the Ravensburg Towerstars at the completion of the year on April 24, 2014.

In the following 2014–15 season, Edwards continued his prolific scoring pace from the blueline, helping the Towerstars reach the post season with 51 points in 49 games to be named as the DEL2 defenseman of the year. Edwards performance attracted interest from the top tier German league and on March 26, 2015, he signed a one-year contract with the Straubing Tigers.

Edwards played three seasons in Straubing before leaving as a free agent following the 2017–18 campaign. On April 19, 2018 he agreed to continue in the DEL, joining ERC Ingolstadt on a one-year contract.

On March 20, 2020, Edwards joined his third DEL club as a free agent, agreeing to a two-year contract with Kölner Haie.

At the conclusion of his contract with Kölner Haie, Edwards returned as a free agent to former club, ERC Ingolstadt, signing a one-year contract on May 15, 2022.

Career statistics

Awards and honours

References

External links 

1987 births
Canadian expatriate ice hockey players in Germany
Canadian ice hockey defencemen
Cincinnati Cyclones (ECHL) players
Florida Everblades players
ERC Ingolstadt players
ESV Kaufbeuren players
Kölner Haie players
Lake Erie Monsters players
Living people
Peoria Rivermen (AHL) players
Providence Bruins players
Rochester Americans players
Straubing Tigers players
UMass Lowell River Hawks men's ice hockey players
AHCA Division I men's ice hockey All-Americans